HMS Resolution was a 70-gun third-rate ship of the line of the Royal Navy, launched at Harwich Dockyard on 6 December 1667. She was one of only three third-rate vessels designed and built by the noted maritime architect Sir Anthony Deane.

History
Resolution served as the flagship in an expedition against the Barbary Corsairs in 1669 and took part in the unsuccessful attack on the Dutch Smyrna convoy, which resulted in the Third Dutch War. She was later girdled, which increased her breadth slightly, and underwent a rebuilding in 1698 – although this limited reconstruction did not involve taking her hull to pieces. She was lost in 1703.

By 1685, Resolution was only armed with 68 guns. She was relaunched after a rebuild at Chatham Dockyard on 30 April 1698, as a 70-gun ship once more.

Sinking
In the Great Storm of 1703 in Pevensey Bay, East Sussex, she hit the Owers Bank off Littlehampton before the crew could even get up sail, then blown across the Solent, limping on around Beachy Head.  With the ship seriously flooded, her captain, Thomas Liell, tried unsuccessfully to beach her in Pevensey Bay, but the crew had to abandon ship, and all made it ashore.

Wreck
It was only when a 12 ft anchor appeared that Paul Stratford, Martin Wiltshire, and Steve Paice then found dozens of cast-iron cannon around a timber hull. The discovery was kept secret whilst a preliminary survey by Wessex Archaeology was carried out at the site and whilst discussions were carried out as to how best to protect it. This found at least 45 large cannon, along with a ballast mound surrounded by wooden ribs and planking protruding from a seabed of sand and silt. These all seemed to be from a large warship dating between 1600 and 1800 which is 'likely' to be Resolution.

The site was then in May 2006 made public and given official protection under the Protection of Wrecks Act 1973, banning unauthorised diving within 100 m, by culture Minister David Lammy  Martin Wiltshire and Steve Paice allowed Paul Stratford take on the responsibilities of licensee applicant. The wreck is a Protected Wreck managed by 

Ian Oxley, head of maritime archaeology at English Heritage, called the ship 'a crucial part of England's seafaring heritage'.
One of the divers, Mr Paul Stratford, 41, who had only been diving for four years, said they were 'very proud' of their find and added:

'It was unbelievable.  We went down there expecting to get some fishing junk and found a huge anchor. Visibility was poor but we kept finding cannon after cannon. We have been fishing and then diving in this area since we were kids, so were astonished to find this in our bay. It feeds your imagination about what else might be down there.'Many people dive for years hoping to find something like this, but we really stumbled upon it.  We've been diving for four or five years and fished here as well, and to find this on our own doorstep is unbelievable.  There is the anchor, some cannon, a large area of brickwork which is believed to be the galley area, but the site hasn't been dug up or disturbed at the moment. We've only been recording what's down there.  We've been working closely with English Heritage and the Nautical Archaeology Society in Portsmouth.'It was obvious once we came across it that it was a big war ship.  It had to be because of the number of guns there.  The lack of any steel made us realise that we were dealing with a timber ship and very soon afterwards we found the hull structure.  We believe it is the HMS Resolution. We can't be certain until we can find something so that we can date it. But with all the information pulled in for us, it looks most likely that it is the Resolution.'

If the wreck does prove to be HMS Resolution, it is already owned by the Nautical Museums Trust in Hastings, which bought rights to the yet-to-be-found vessel from the MoD in 1985. Their representative, Adrian Barak, said,

'This is a hugely significant find. We can't say it is definitely Resolution but it is almost the exact right place. It is remarkable that this wreck hadn't been discovered before. It may be that the seabed was moved by winter storms which uncovered it.'

For now the 3 divers (who are in 2006 taking NAS Training courses up to Part III, which will equip them to carry out sophisticated survey work) have been appointed as the site's joint licensees and will oversee maintenance, survey and any excavation, in partnership with Wessex Archaeology and with involvement from the Nautical Archaeology Society.  In relation to this the divers have said:

'We are meeting soon with them, Wessex and English Heritage to discuss the way forward.  For one thing, we are in need of project funding to support survey and possible sampling work that might lead to a positive identification.'A physical and virtual dive trail has been developed for the site.

See also
 Wreck diving
 Maritime archaeology
 Underwater archaeology
 Nautical Archaeology Society
 Archaeology of shipwrecks
 List of designations under the Protection of Wrecks Act
 Protection of Wrecks Act

Notes

References

Lavery, Brian (2003) The Ship of the Line - Volume 1: The development of the battlefleet 1650–1850. Conway Maritime Press. .

External links
Resolution Project
Report

Ships of the line of the Royal Navy
Protected Wrecks of England
Maritime incidents in 1703
1660s ships
1703 in England
2005 in England